The Celestial Toymaker is the mostly missing seventh serial of the third season in the British science fiction television programme Doctor Who, which was first broadcast in four weekly parts from 2 to 23 April 1966.

In this serial, the alien time traveller the First Doctor (William Hartnell) and his travelling companions Steven (Peter Purves) and Dodo Chaplet (Jackie Lane) are pitted against a powerful adversary called the Celestial Toymaker (Michael Gough). The Toymaker separates the Doctor from his companions to play the Trilogic Game, while Steven and Dodo are forced to win a series of seemingly childish but deadly games before they can be reunited with the Doctor and return to the TARDIS.

Only the last episode of this story, "The Final Test", is held in the BBC archives; the other three remain missing. "The Final Test" has been released on VHS and DVD, and the story has been novelised.

Plot
An alien intelligence has invaded the TARDIS and rendered the First Doctor invisible, leaving Dodo and Steven incredulous. They step outside into a strange realm where the Doctor reappears. They have come to the realm of the Celestial Toymaker, an eternal being of infinite power who sets games and traps for the unwary so that they become his playthings. The Doctor and the Toymaker have faced each other before, and the Toymaker abducts his old adversary to another place. The Doctor appears in the Toymaker's study, where he is given the Trilogic game, a ten-piece puzzle (similar to the Tower of Hanoi) whose pieces must all be moved and remounted in a 1023-move sequence.

Steven and Dodo face different challenges. The first are two clowns, Joey and Clara, full of childish tricks and a dangerous game of Blind Man's Bluff. The clowns are made to replay the game when it is clear they are cheating, and the second time round Joey loses his footing on an obstacle course and the challengers are transformed into twisted dolls on the floor. Steven and Dodo then venture down a corridor into another chamber with three chairs and a challenge from living playing cards, the King and Queen of Hearts, along with a Knave and a Joker. An adjoining room has a further four chairs, and Steven deduces that six of the seven chairs are deadly to sit on. Seven mannequins are provided to be used for testing on the chairs. The King and Queen play alongside them, and some of the mannequins are destroyed as seats are proven unsafe and eliminated. The King and Queen are trapped when they sit in a chair which folds in on them.

Steven and Dodo next meet the comical Sgt. Rugg and Mrs. Wiggs in a kitchen. They challenge them to hunt the thimble – the key to the exit door. Dodo finds the key inside the large pie which Mrs Wiggs was making. She and Steven depart and enter another room with a dancing floor. There they encounter the three mannequins not destroyed by the chairs, who transform into ballerinas and start to dance. At the far end of the floor is the TARDIS. Steven and Dodo get trapped as partners with two of the dolls and only free themselves by swapping their partners for each other. They pelt on to the TARDIS, but the police box is a fake.

The Toymaker chooses Cyril the schoolboy to take on his companions. Dodo and Steven find themselves in a vast game of hopscotch against Cyril, who slips on a triangle he has booby-trapped and is electrocuted. Dodo and Steven thus reach the TARDIS.

In the Toymaker's study at the same time, the Doctor is at the final stage of the Trilogic Game. The three friends are reunited, with Steven and Dodo sent into the TARDIS for safety while the Toymaker challenges the Doctor to complete the Game. The Doctor realises that when he makes the move and the Game is won, the Toymaker's domain will disappear – and the TARDIS with it. He orders the last piece to move using the Toymaker's voice from inside the TARDIS, allowing them to depart while the Toymaker's world is destroyed.

Production
Working titles for this story included The Toymaker and The Trilogic Game. Brian Hayles was unavailable to do necessary rewrites, so then script editor Donald Tosh performed them. As Tosh would no longer be script editor by the time the story was transmitted, he agreed with Hayles to take the writer's credit, with Hayles being credited for the idea. After Tosh finished work on the scripts, his successor, Gerry Davis, was forced to make further rewrites due to a budget shortfall. Tosh was unhappy with the rewrites and refused to be credited, while Davis could not take a credit because he was the series' script editor. As a result of this, Hayles was the sole credited author on the final serial, despite the fact that he had not worked on it in three months and the final scripts bore little to no resemblance to what he wrote.

William Hartnell was on holiday during the recordings of Episodes 2 & 3, "The Hall of Dolls" and "The Dancing Floor". Pre-recordings of his voice were heard in episode 2 and Albert Ward was a hand double (sporting the Doctor's ring) for scenes where the mostly invisible Doctor played the Trilogic Game throughout the story. The story was commissioned by producer John Wiles, who left the series before it was recorded after several clashes with William Hartnell. His intention was to replace Hartnell in the role of the Doctor during the story, having the character reappear in a new guise after the invisibility was removed by the Toymaker. The BBC's head of serials, Gerald Savory, vetoed the idea, leading to Wiles quitting in protest.

All episodes of this story except Episode 4, "The Final Test", are missing from the BBC archives. Only audio recordings and production stills survive from the first three episodes, as no tele-snaps were captured. Wiles opted not to use John Cura's services during his tenure, which has led to many visual elements of Wiles' stories to be completely lost. This serial is one of the more well-documented of Season 3's broadcast without tele-snaps, so more photographs of these elements survive than the preceding stories, including the sets, costumes and actual colour of everything.

Cast notes
Michael Gough later appeared in the Fifth Doctor story Arc of Infinity (1983). Peter Stephens later appeared in the Second Doctor story The Underwater Menace (1967). Carmen Silvera later appeared in the Third Doctor story Invasion of the Dinosaurs (1974).

Broadcast and reception

 Episode is missing

BBC Television, the producers, received complaints from lawyers acting on behalf of the late Frank Richards' estate. The character Cyril (played by Peter Stephens) was said to bear a remarkable resemblance to Billy Bunter. The BBC subsequently issued a disclaimer saying that Cyril was merely "Bunter-like".<ref>Cyril or Billy? The resemblance causes allegations of plagiarism against Doctor Who'''s producers, the BBC: IMDB.com website. Retrieved 24 February 2008.</ref>

The BBC's Audience Research Report on the final episode found that it "had little appeal for a large proportion of the sample, over a third of whom actually disliked it."  Some found the episode to be lacking in action and it was also criticised for 'ham' acting, although other viewers had enjoyed the cast's performance.  The audience sample mostly found the story as a whole to be too different to the usual Doctor Who story format, being more of a whimsical fantasy.  The most critical viewers dismissed it as "ridiculous rubbish", others said that although disliking it themselves, their children had enjoyed it.

The serial was positively received by Patrick Mulkern of Radio Times who said the first episode was "undoubtedly a fantasy classic".  Mulkern thought that Michael Gough did not get much screen time in his role as the Toymaker, but "exudes menace ... and has that fabulous voice."  The review also praised Dudley Simpson's musical score, and the "excellent" costume and design.

Commercial releases

In print

A novelisation of this serial, written by Gerry Davis and Alison Bingeman, was published by Target Books in June 1986. It is one of the few Doctor Who novels (original or adapted) to be written by more than one person.

Home media
The fourth episode, "The Final Test", was released on The Hartnell Years VHS in 1991, albeit with the "Next Episode" caption rather clumsily cut from the cliffhanger scene (this was unavoidable, as the 16mm black & white film telerecording was itself incomplete). In November 2004, "The Final Test" was released in digitally re-mastered form (with the "Next Episode" caption restored) on DVD in Region 1 and Region 2 in a three-disc Lost in Time'' box set.

An audio-only version of the serial was released on Compact Disc in 2001, featuring linking narrations by Peter Purves. One of these narrations is deliberately inserted to obscure a line in "The Hall of Dolls" where the King of Hearts recites a racially-charged version of "Eeny, meeny, miny, moe" that includes a racial slur.

References

External links

First Doctor serials
Doctor Who missing episodes
Doctor Who serials novelised by Gerry Davis
Doctor Who serials written by Brian Hayles
1966 British television episodes